Thaleischweiler-Wallhalben is a Verbandsgemeinde ("collective municipality") in the Südwestpfalz district, in Rhineland-Palatinate, Germany. The seat of the municipality is in Thaleischweiler-Fröschen. It was formed on 1 July 2014 by the merger of the former Verbandsgemeinden Thaleischweiler-Fröschen and Wallhalben. Before 1 January 2016, the Verbandsgemeinde was named Thaleischweiler-Fröschen - Wallhalben.

The Verbandsgemeinde Thaleischweiler-Wallhalben consists of the following Ortsgemeinden ("local municipalities"):

{|
|
 Biedershausen
 Herschberg
 Hettenhausen
 Höheischweiler
 Höhfröschen
 Knopp-Labach
 Krähenberg
 Maßweiler
 Nünschweiler
 Obernheim-Kirchenarnbach
|valign=top|
 Petersberg
 Reifenberg
 Rieschweiler-Mühlbach
 Saalstadt
 Schauerberg
 Schmitshausen
 Thaleischweiler-Fröschen
 Wallhalben
 Weselberg
 Winterbach
|}

External links 
 Verbandsgemeinde Thaleischweiler-Wallhalben

Verbandsgemeinde in Rhineland-Palatinate